Yevgeniya Yevgenivna Gomon (born 25 March 1995) is a Ukrainian group rhythmic gymnast. She is the 2013 World bronze medalist in 10 clubs and 2015 Universiade champion in 6 clubs + 2 hoops.

Career 
Gomon represents her nation at international competitions. She participated at the 2012 Summer Olympics in London.

She also competed at world championships.
At the 2013 World Championships, Gomon won the bronze medal in the 10 clubs event.
At the 2015 European Games in Baku she won the silver medal in the ribbons event and the bronze medal in the clubs and hoops event.

Gomon was named in the Ukrainian team to the 2016 Summer Olympics in Rio.

References

External links 
 
 http://www.zimbio.com/photos/Yevgeniya+Gomon/Gymnastics+Rhythmic+Olympics+Day+16/qjv3Noq252g

1995 births
Living people
Ukrainian rhythmic gymnasts
Gymnasts at the 2012 Summer Olympics
Olympic gymnasts of Ukraine
Gymnasts at the 2015 European Games
European Games medalists in gymnastics
European Games silver medalists for Ukraine
European Games bronze medalists for Ukraine
Medalists at the Rhythmic Gymnastics World Championships
Sportspeople from Zaporizhzhia
Universiade medalists in gymnastics
Universiade gold medalists for Ukraine
Universiade silver medalists for Ukraine
Universiade bronze medalists for Ukraine
Medalists at the 2013 Summer Universiade
Medalists at the 2015 Summer Universiade
21st-century Ukrainian women